A Jitney Elopement was Charlie Chaplin's fifth film for Essanay Films. It starred Chaplin and Edna Purviance as lovers, with Purviance wanting Chaplin to take her away from an arranged marriage her father (played by Fred Goodwins) had planned for her. Chaplin does take her away in a jitney, a type of share taxi popular in the US between 1914 and 1916. Most of the film was made in San Francisco and includes scenes of San Francisco's Golden Gate Park and the large windmills still on the park's west side.

Synopsis
Edna's father greedily wants her to marry wealthy Count Chloride de Lime whom neither she nor he has ever met. Unknown to Edna's father, his daughter already has a true love:  Charlie.  Edna drops a note to her Charlie explaining her plight and asking him be her knight and save her.  Charlie agrees.  He arrives at Edna's home and impersonates the Count at dinner.  Charlie humorously consumes beans with a knife, but still manages to keep up the facade of being a count.  However, the true Count de Lime arrives and Charlie is roughly escorted away as an impostor.  The count takes Edna to a nearby park to woo her, but Charlie is close by, as is Edna's father.  Charlie interrupts the Count's romantic plans and begins a fight with the Count, Edna's father and three park policemen.

An automobile chase featuring Edna and Charlie in one car (a two-seater roadster) and the pursuers in another (a four-seater) ends with a few timely and accurate brick tosses by Charlie and the pursuing vehicle being bumped off a pier.  The movie ends with Edna and Charlie shyly kissing in their vehicle.

Curiously Edna's name is given as Edna in an early title card and Edena mid-way. When she throws a note out of her window to Charlie, it is signed Iona Lott (I own a lot).

Review
A reviewer for Motion Picture World wrote, "There is a vein of romance throughout the story which, combined with Chaplin's inimitable comedy, gives the picture a general appeal."

Cast
 Charles Chaplin as Suitor, the Fake Count
 Edna Purviance as Edna/Edena/Iona Lott
 Ernest Van Pelt as Edna's father
 Leo White as Count Chloride de Lime, Edna's Suitor
 Lloyd Bacon as Young Butler / Cop (uncredited) 
 Paddy McGuire as Old Butler/Cop
 Bud Jamison as Cop with Baton
 Carl Stockdale as Cop
 Fred Goodwins as Car owner

External links

 A Jitney Elopement on YouTube

Short films directed by Charlie Chaplin
American silent short films
1915 films
American black-and-white films
1915 comedy films
Essanay Studios films
Silent American comedy films
Articles containing video clips
1915 short films
American comedy short films
1910s American films